Marcel Noual (3 July 1912 – 1 October 1995) was a French swimmer. He competed in the men's 100 metre backstroke at the 1932 Summer Olympics.

References

External links
 

1912 births
1995 deaths
French male backstroke swimmers
Olympic swimmers of France
Swimmers at the 1932 Summer Olympics
Swimmers from Paris